Bukhara (Uzbek: /, ;) is the seventh-largest city in Uzbekistan, with a population of 280,187 , and the capital of Bukhara Region.

People have inhabited the region around Bukhara for at least five millennia, and the city has existed for half that time. Located on the Silk Road, the city has long served as a center of trade, scholarship, culture, and religion. The mother tongue of the majority of people of Bukhara is Tajik, a dialect of the Persian language, although Uzbek is spoken as a second language by most residents. Bukhara served as the capital of the Samanid Empire, Khanate of Bukhara, and Emirate of Bukhara and was the birthplace of scholar Imam Bukhari. The city has been known as "Noble Bukhara" (Bukhārā-ye sharīf). Bukhara has about 140 architectural monuments. UNESCO has listed the historic center of Bukhara (which contains numerous mosques and madrasas) as a World Heritage Site.

Names
The exact name of the city of Bukhara in ancient times is unknown. The whole oasis was called Bukhara in ancient times, and probably only in the tenth century it was finally transferred to the city.

According to some scholars, the name dates back to the Sanskrit "Vihara" (Buddhist monastery). This word is very close to the word in the language of the Uyghur and Chinese Buddhists, who named their places of worship the same way. Very few artifacts related to Buddhism have survived to modern age in the city. But, numerous Arabic, Persian, European and Chinese travellers and historians noted the place and Uzbekistan itself to be once populated by mostly Buddhists and few Zoroastrians. Indeed, the first Islamic text on Bukhara relates to the first Arab invader of Bukhara, Ubaidullah bin Ziad, who noted Bukhara to be a Buddhist country with Buddhist monasteries ruled by a queen regent acting on behalf of her son.

According to other sources (such as Encyclopædia Iranica), the name Bukhara is possibly derived from the Sogdian βuxārak ("Place of Good Fortune"), a name for Buddhist monasteries.

In the Tang dynasty, and other successive dynasties of Imperial China, Bukhara was known under the name of Buhe/Puhe (捕喝), which has been replaced in Chinese by the modern generic phonetic spelling Bùhālā (布哈拉).

In the 19-20th centuries, Bukhara was known as Bokhara, in the English publications, as exemplified by the writings and reports on the Emirate of Bukhara during the Great Game.

Muhammad ibn Jafar Narshakhi in his History of Bukhara (completed AD 943–44) mentions: 
Since the Middle Ages, the city has been known as Buḫārā / بخارا in Arabic and Persian sources. The modern Uzbek spelling is Buxoro.

The city's name was mythologized as Albracca in the Italian epic poem Orlando Innamorato, published in 1483 by Matteo Maria Boiardo.

History

The history of Bukhara stretches back millennia. By 850, Bukhara served as the capital of the Samanid Empire, and was the birthplace of Imam Bukhari.

At the beginning of the 11th century, Bukhara became part of the Turkic state of the Karakhanids. The rulers of the Karakhanids built many buildings in Bukhara: the Kalyan minaret, the Magoki Attori mosque, palaces and parks.

Bukhara lies west of Samarkand and was previously a focal point of learning eminent all through the Islamic world. It is the old neighborhood of the incomparable Sheik Naqshbandi. He was a focal figure in the advancement of the mysterious Sufi way to deal with theory, religion and Islam.

It is now the capital of Bukhara Region (viloyat) of Uzbekistan. Located on the Silk Road, the city has long been a center of trade, scholarship, culture, and religion. During the golden age of the Samanids, Bukhara became a major intellectual center of the Islamic world, and was renown for its numerous libraries. The historic center of Bukhara, which contains numerous mosques and madrassas, has been listed by UNESCO as a World Heritage Site.

Genghis Khan besieged Bukhara for 15 days in 1220. As an important trading centre, Bukhara was home to a community of medieval Indian merchants from the city of Multan (modern-day Pakistan) who were noted to own land in the city.

Bukhara was the last capital of the Emirate of Bukhara and was besieged by the Red Army during the Russian Civil War. During the Bukhara operation of 1920, Red Army troops under the command of Bolshevik general Mikhail Frunze attacked the city of Bukhara. On 31 August 1920, the Emir Alim Khan fled to Dushanbe in Eastern Bukhara (later he escaped from Dushanbe to Kabul in Afghanistan). On 2 September 1920, after four days of fighting, the emir's citadel (the Ark) was destroyed, the red flag was raised from the top of Kalyan Minaret. On 14 September 1920, the All-Bukharan Revolutionary Committee was set up, headed by A. Mukhitdinov. The government—the Council of People's Nazirs (see nāẓir)—was presided over by Faizullah Khojaev.

The Bukharan People's Soviet Republic existed from 1920 to 1925 when the city was integrated into the Uzbek Soviet Socialist Republic. Fitzroy Maclean, then a young diplomat in the British Embassy in Moscow, made a surreptitious visit to Bokhara in 1938, sight-seeing and sleeping in parks. In his memoir Eastern Approaches, he judged it an "enchanted city" with buildings that rivalled "the finest architecture of the Italian Renaissance". In the latter half of the 20th century, the war in Afghanistan and civil war in Tajikistan brought Dari- and Tajik-speaking refugees into Bukhara and Samarkand. After integrating themselves into the local Tajik population, these cities face a movement for annexation into Tajikistan with which the cities have no common border.

Historic monuments in Bukhara

Architectural complexes
 Po-i-Kalyan Complex. The title Po-i Kalan (also Poi Kalân,  meaning the "Grand Foundation") belongs to the architectural complex located at the base of the great minaret Kalân.
Kalyan minaret. More properly, Minâra-i Kalân, (Persian/Tajik for the "Grand Minaret"). Also known as the Tower of Death, as according to legend it is the site where criminals were executed by being thrown off the top for centuries. The minaret is the most famed part of the ensemble, and dominates over historical center of the city. The role of the minaret is largely for traditional and decorative purposes—its dimension exceeds the bounds of the main function of the minaret, which is to provide a vantage point from which the muezzin can call out people to prayer. For this purpose it was enough to ascend to a roof of mosque. This practice was common in initial years of Islam. The word "minaret" derives from the Arabic word "minara" ("lighthouse", or more literally "a place where something burn"). The minarets of the region were possible adaptations of "fire-towers" or lighthouses of previous Zoroastrian eras. The architect, whose name was simply Bako, designed the minaret in the form of a circular-pillar brick tower, narrowing upwards. There is a brick spiral staircase that twists up inside around the pillar, leading to the landing in sixteen-arched rotunda and skylight, upon which is based a magnificently designed stalactite cornice (or "sharif").

Kalân Mosque (Masjid-i Kalân), arguably completed in 1514, is equal to the Bibi-Khanym Mosque in Samarkand in size. The mosque is able to accommodate twelve thousand people. Although Kalyan Mosque and Bibi-Khanym Mosque of Samarkand are of the same type of building, they are different in terms of art of building. Two hundred and eighty-eight monumental pylons serve as a support for the multi-domed roofing of the galleries encircling the courtyard of Kalyan Mosque. The longitudinal axis of the courtyard ends up with a portal to the main chamber (maksura) with a cruciform hall, topped with a massive blue cupola on a mosaic drum. The edifice keeps many architectural curiosities, for example, a hole in one of domes. Through this hole one can see foundation of Kalyan Minaret. Then moving back step by step, one can count all belts of brickwork of the minaret to the rotunda.
Mir-i Arab Madrassah (1535–1536). The construction of Mir-i-Arab Madrasah (Miri Arab Madrasah) is ascribed to Sheikh Abdullah Yamani of Yemen—called Mir-i-Arab—the spiritual mentor of Ubaidullah-khan and his son Abdul-Aziz-khan. Ubaidullah-khan waged permanent successful war with Iran. At least three times his troops seized Herat. Each of such plundering raids on Iran was accompanied by capture of great many captives. They say that Ubaidullah-khan had invested money gained from redemption of more than three thousand Persian captives into construction of Mir-i-Arab Madrasah. Ubaidullah-khan was very religious. He had been nurtured in high respect for Islam in the spirit of Sufism. His father named him in honor of prominent sheikh of the 15th century Ubaidullah al-Ahrar (1404–1490), by origin from Tashkent Region. By the thirties of the 16th century the time, when sovereigns erected splendid mausoleums for themselves and for their relatives, was over. Khans of Shaibanid dynasty were standard-bearers of Koran traditions. The significance of religion was so great that even such famed khan as Ubaidullah was conveyed to earth close by his mentor in his madrasah. In the middle of the vault (gurhana) in Mir-i-Arab Madrasah is situated the wooden tomb of Ubaidullah-khan. At his head is wrapped in the moulds his mentor, Mir-i-Arab. Muhammad Kasim, mudarris (a senior teacher) of the madrasah (died in 1047 hijra) is also interred near by here. The portal of Miri Arab Madrasah is situated on one axis with the portal of the Kalyan Mosque. However, because of some lowering of the square to the east it was necessary to raise a little an edifice of the madrasah on a platform.

Lab-i Hauz Complex (or Lab-e hauz, meaning by the pond) Ensemble (1568–1622) is the name of the area surrounding one of the few remaining hauz, or pond, in the city of Bukhara. Several such ponds existed in Bukhara prior to Soviet rule. The ponds acted as the city's principal source of water, but were also notorious for spreading disease, and thus were mostly filled in during the 1920s and 1930s by the Soviets. The Lab-i Hauz survived owing to its role as the centerpiece of an architectural ensemble dating back to the 16th to 17th centuries. The Lab-i Hauz ensemble consists of the 16th-century Kukeldash Madrasah, the largest in the city, along the north side of the pond. On the eastern and western sides of the pond are a 17th-century lodging-house for itinerant Sufis, and a 17th-century madrasah.

There is also a metal sculpture of Nasruddin Hodja, the quick-witted and warm-hearted man, who forms the central character of many children's folk stories in Central Asian, Afghanistan, and Pakistan, sitting atop his mule with one hand on his heart and the other with an 'All OK' sign above his head.

Bahoutdin Architectural Complex is a necropolis commemorating Shaykh Baha-ud-Din or Bohoutdin, the founder of Naqshbandi order. The complex includes the dahma (gravestone) of Bahoutdin, Khakim Kushbegi mosque, Muzaffarkan mosque, and Abdul-Lazizkhan khanqah. The site is listed on the UNESCO World Heritage Site tentative list on January 18, 2008.

Fortress

Bukhara Fortress, the Ark

Mausoleums
Chashma-Ayub Mausoleum
Chashma-Ayub, or Job's spring, is located near the Samani mausoleum. Its name is said to reflect a legend that states the prophet Job ("Ayub" in the Quran) visited this place and brought forth a spring of water by the blow of his staff on the ground. The water of this well is said to be exceptionally pure, and is regarded for its supposed "healing qualities." The current edifice at the site was constructed during the reign of Timur, and features a Khwarazm-style conical dome that is otherwise uncommon in the region.

Ismail Samani mausoleum
The Ismail Samani mausoleum (9th–10th centuries), is one of the most highly esteemed work of Central Asian architecture. It was built in the 9th century (between 892 and 943) as the resting-place of Ismail Samani—the founder of the Samanid dynasty, which was the last native Persian dynasty to rule the region in the 9th to 10th centuries, after the Samanids established virtual independence from the Abbasid Caliphate in Baghdad.

The site is unique for its architectural style which combines both Zoroastrian and Islamic motifs. The building's facade is covered in intricately decorated brick work, which features circular patterns reminiscent of the sun—a common image in Zoroastrian art from the region at that time which is reminiscent of the Zoroastrian god, Ahura Mazda, who is typically represented by fire and light. The building's shape is cuboid, and reminiscent of the Ka'aba in Makkah, while the domed roof is a typical feature of mosque architecture. The syncretic style of the shrine is reflective of the 9th to 10th centuries—a time when the region still had large populations of Zoroastrians who had begun to convert to Islam around that time.

The shrine is also regarded as one of the oldest monuments in the Bukhara region. At the time of Genghis Khan's invasion, the shrine was said to have already been buried in mud from flooding. Thus, when the Mongol hordes reached Bukhara, the shrine was spared from their destruction.

The mausoleum of Pakistan's founding father, Muhammad Ali Jinnah, known as the Mazar-e-Quaid in Karachi, was modeled after the shrine.

Mosques
Bolo Haouz Mosque
Built in 1712, on the opposite side of the citadel of Ark in Registan district, Bolo Haouz Mosque is inscribed in the UNESCO World Heritage Site list along with the other parts of the historic city. It served as a Friday mosque during the time when the emir of Bukhara was being subjugated under the Bolshevik Russian rule in 1920s.

Char Minar

Char Minor (alternatively spelled Chor Minor, and also alternatively known as the Madrasah of Khalif Niyaz-kul) is a building tucked away in a lane northeast of the Lyabi Hauz complex. The structure was built by Khalif Niyaz-kul, a wealthy Bukharan of Turkmen origin in the 19th century under the rule of the Janid dynasty. The four-towered structure is sometimes mistaken for a gate to the madras that once existed behind the structure; however, the Char-Minar is actually a complex of buildings with two functions, ritual and shelter.

The main edifice is a mosque. In spite of its unusual outward shape, the building has a typical interior for a Central Asian mosque. Owing to the buildings cupola, the room has good acoustic properties and therefore takes on special significance of 'dhikr-hana'—a place for ritualized 'dhikr' ceremonies of Sufi, the liturgy of which often include recitation, singing, and instrumental music.

On either side of the central edifice are located dwelling rooms, some of which have collapsed, leaving only their foundations visible. Consequently, for full functioning of madrasah only of classroom and some utility rooms is lacking. However, it was common practice that so-called madrasahs had no lecture rooms or, even if they had, no lectures had been given in them. These madrasahs were employed as student hospices.

Each of the four towers has different decorational motifs. Some say that elements of decoration reflect the four religions known to Central Asians. One can find elements reminiscent of a cross, a Christian fish motif, and a Buddhist praying-wheel, in addition to Zoroastrian and Islamic motifs. 
In 1995, due to an underground brook, one of the four towers collapsed  and emergency assistance was applied for and granted by UNESCO under the World Heritage Fund. Although the collapse resulted in destabilizing the entire structure, the authorities were anxious to keep awareness of the disaster to a minimum. Without explanation the building disappeared from the list of sights and after hurried reconstruction of the tower "using non-traditional building material, such as poor quality cement and steel" Char Minar returned as one of the most popular sights of the city, yet the event has been kept secret ever since.

On the esplanade to the right from Char-Minar is a pool, likely of the same age as the rest of the building complex. Char Minar is now surrounded mainly by small houses and shops along its perimeter.

Magok-i-Attari Mosque

The former Magoki Attori mosque was constructed in the 9th century on the remains of what may have been an older Zoroastrian temple. The mosque was destroyed and rebuilt more than once, and the oldest part now remaining is the south façade, which dates from the 12th century—making it one of the oldest surviving structures in Bukhara, and one of few which survived the onslaught of Genghis Khan. Lower than the surrounding ground level, the mosque was excavated in 1935. It no longer functions as a mosque, but, rather, houses a carpet museum.

Mosque of Mir Sayyid Ali Hamadani
In Bukhara there is a mosque which is said to be that of Mir Sayyid Ali Hamadani, the patron saint of Kashmiri Muslims in the Valley of Kashmir.

Geography

Climate 
Bukhara has a typically Central Asian cool arid climate (Köppen BWk).

The water was important in the hot, dry climate of Central Asia, so from ancient times, irrigation farming was developed. Cities were built near rivers and water channels were built to serve the entire city. Uncovered reservoirs, known as hauzes, were constructed. Special covered water reservoirs, or sardobas, were built along caravan routes to supply travelers and their animals with water.

However, the heavy use of agrochemicals during the era under the Soviet Union, diversion of huge amounts of irrigation water from the two rivers that feed Uzbekistan, and the chronic lack of water treatment plants, have caused health and environmental problems on an enormous scale.

Transportation

Bukhara International Airport has regularly scheduled flights to cities in Uzbekistan and Russia. The Turkmenistan border is about 80 km away with the nearest city there being Türkmenabat, connected via the M37 highway which continues to other places in Turkmenistan including Ashgabat. The city is also served by railroad links with the rest of Uzbekistan, and is a hub for roadways leading to all major cities in Uzbekistan and beyond, including Mazar-i-Sharif in Afghanistan via the M39 highway. The city of Samarkand is 215 km to the east of Bukhara.

Internal transportation facilities

Bukhara city is the largest transport hub after Tashkent in Uzbekistan. Inside the city there is facility of bus transportation. There are over 45 bus lines. Majority of them have been equipped with ISUZU buses but some buses are being brought from China. By the number of buses and bus routes facilities Bukhara is the largest after Tashkent in Uzbekistan.

Demographics
Bukhara recorded a population of 279,200 in the year 2019. Bukhara (along with Samarkand) is one of the two major centers of Uzbekistan's Tajik minority. Bukhara was also home to the Bukharan Jews, whose ancestors settled in the city during Roman times. Most Bukharian Jews left Bukhara between 1925 and 2000.

Ali-Akbar Dehkhoda defines the name Bukhara itself as meaning "full of knowledge", referring to the fact that in antiquity, Bukhara was a scientific and scholarship powerhouse.
In the Italian romantic epic Orlando innamorato by Matteo Maria Boiardo, Bukhara is called Albracca and described as a major city of Cathay. There, within its walled city and fortress, Angelica and the knights she has befriended make their stand when attacked by Agrican, emperor of Tartary. As described, this siege by Agrican resembles the historic siege by Genghis Khan in 1220.

Ethnic groups 
According to the official statistics, the city's population is 82% Uzbeks, 6% Russians, 4% Tajiks, 3% Tatars, 1% Koreans, 1% Turkmens, 1% Ukrainians, 2% of other ethnicities. However, official Uzbek numbers have for long been criticized and refuted by various observers and Western sources and it is widely assumed that the population of the city consists mainly of Tajik-speaking Tajiks, with ethnic Uzbeks forming a growing minority. Exact figures are difficult to evaluate, since many people in Uzbekistan either identify as "Uzbek" even though they speak Tajik as their first language, or because they are registered as Uzbeks by the central government despite their Tajik language and identity. According to Soviet estimates in the early 20th century (based on numbers from 1913 and 1917), the Tajiks formed the overwhelming majority of city.

Religion 
The religion with the largest community of followers is Islam. The majority of the Muslims are Sunni Muslims who make up 88 percent of the population. Eastern Orthodox make up 9 percent, and others 3 percent.

Notable people

Many notable people lived in Bukhara in the past. Among them are:

 An Lushan (c. 703–757)
 Muhammad Ibn Ismail Ibn Ibrahim Ibn al-Mughirah Ibn Bardizbah al-Bukhari (810–870) – Islamic scholar and compiler of hadiths
 Avicenna (Abu Ali ibn Sina) (980–1037) – Persian physician and philosopher
 Qumri (fl. Mind 10th Century d. approx. 980–990)—physician and scholar, purported to be Avicenna's teacher
 Bal'ami: Abolfazl Muhammad and his son Abu-Ali Mohammad, two famous Persian viziers of Samanid kings, historians and patrons of art and literature
 Abubakr Narshakhi (10th century) – historian who wrote History of Bukhara
 Sadiduddin Muhammad Aufi (1171–1242) historian, scientist, and author.
 Syed Jalaluddin Surkh-Posh Bukhari (c. 595–690 AH, 1199–1291 CE)
Sayyid Ajjal Shams al-Din Omar (1211–1279)
 Baha-ud-Din Naqshband Bukhari (1318–1389)
 Amir Kulal (died in 1370)
 Sadriddin Ayni (1878–1954)
 Abdurauf Fitrat (1886–1938) 
 Fayzulla Khodzhayev (1896–1938)
 Ibraghim Muminov (1908–1974)
 Sorojon Yusufova (1910–1966)
 Muhammadjon Shakuri (1925–2012)
 Yitzhak Apeloig (born 1944), Israeli computational chemistry professor and President of the Technion
 Oksana Chusovitina - Olympic gymnast (born 1975)

International relations
The following is a list of Bukhara's sister cities:

 Bonn, Germany (1999)
 Córdoba, Spain (1983)
 Khujand, Tajikistan
 Lahore, Pakistan (1995)
 Malatya, Turkey
 Rueil-Malmaison, France (1999)
 Santa Fe, United States (1988)

See also
Bukhara rug
List of World Heritage Sites in Uzbekistan

References

Sources

Further reading
 Moorcroft, W. and Trebeck, G. (1841). Travels in the Himalayan Provinces of Hindustan and the Panjab; in Ladakh and Kashmir, in Peshawar, Kabul, Kunduz, and Bokhara... from 1819 to 1825, Vol. II. Reprint: New Delhi, Sagar Publications, 1971.

External links

 Through the Lens—the Silk Road Then and Now -A century of change is captured in photos of a fabled Central Asian oasis.
 Forbes, Andrew, & Henley, David: Timur's Legacy: The Architecture of Bukhara and Samarkand (CPA Media).
 UNESCO World Heritage list: Historic Centre of Bukhara
 Audio interview with Bukhara resident about life in Bukhara
 

 
Cities in Uzbekistan
Populated places along the Silk Road
Populated places in Bukhara Region
Populated places established in the 1st millennium BC
Cities in Central Asia
Historic Jewish communities
+
World Heritage Sites in Uzbekistan
Sogdian cities